Count Damien de Martel (November 27, 1878 – January 21, 1940) was a French politician and diplomat. He was a minister plenipotentiary in China, then in Latvia, Japan and the sixth High Commissioner of the Levant in Syria and Lebanon from July 16, 1933 till January 1939.

See also
 High Commissioner of the Levant

References

French diplomats
French Mandate for Syria and the Lebanon
French politicians
1878 births
1950 deaths
French expatriates in China
French expatriates in Japan